Michael Shayne, Private Detective is a 1940 American mystery film directed by Eugene Forde and starring Lloyd Nolan, Marjorie Weaver and Joan Valerie. It is based on Brett Halliday's novel The Private Practice of Michael Shayne. It was the first in a series of Michael Shayne films starring Nolan.

Synopsis

In this film, much of the main plot has already happened or happens off-camera. We see a subplot that out-of-work private detective Mike Shayne is hired by his friend, wealthy racing executive Hiram Brighton, to, while he's out of town, watch over his spirited daughter Phyllis, who gambles her money away and has begun dating underworld character Harry Grange, to the consternation of the father.

The key plot involves wealthy but shady Elliott Thomas who owned a horse, Banjo Boy. The odds were 15 to 1 against that horse winning. Thomas had a run of bad luck and needed a quick infusion of cash. In south America he found a champion to switch with the same markings as, and a dead-ringer for, Banjo Boy. So as not to affect the track odds, Thomas engaged Grange as a shill to "spread around" Thomas' large bet of $10,000. The substitute horse wins, and the payoff is $150,000 (equivalent to over $2 million in 2021 purchasing power).

But Grange would not pay Thomas his money, so Thomas hired another shady character, Larry Kincaid, who tries to hire Shayne to go to Shayne's friend and Grange's boss, casino owner Benny Gordon, to ask him to pressure Grange. Shayne refused, so Kincaid went straight to Grange. When Grange told Kincaid the backstory, Kincaid decided to cut himself in on the pot by blackmailing Thomas.

As a result, Thomas and Kincaid brawled, Kincaid ended up dead, and Grange knew of the meeting. At that point, Thomas felt he had no choice but to do away with Grange.

Shortly before Thomas kills Grange, after a meeting in Gordon's casino, Grange had been drugged, then driven to the woods, smeared with ketchup and left in the convertible by Shayne in a scheme to teach Phyllis a lesson about hanging with shady characters. The scheme backfires when they find Grange has actually been shot dead and Shayne's gun is on the ground, having been fired. Shayne has already tipped the police to "a murder in the woods" in the plan to scare Phyllis. Now sirens are heard. Shayne rushes Phillis away in her car but his car won't start and cops arrest him.

In reality, Gordon's daughter Marsha, Grange's angry ex who had been jilted by Grange, happened to stumble upon the crime scene first, became distraught and rushed to her father. In order to protect her from any kind of suspicion, Gordon framed Shayne, having conveniently seen him leave the casino earlier with Grange.

Eventually, Shayne correctly deduces what happened with the murder of Grange, and engineers a trap for Thomas in front of the police, at which point Thomas confesses the horse race plot, the death of Kincaid and throwing his body in the bay, and the murder of Grange, at which point the movie ends.

Cast
 Lloyd Nolan as Michael Shayne  
 Marjorie Weaver as Phyllis Brighton  
 Joan Valerie as Marsha Gordon  
 Walter Abel as Elliott Thomas  
 Elizabeth Patterson as Aunt Olivia  
 Donald MacBride as Chief Painter  
 Douglass Dumbrille as Gordon  
 Clarence Kolb as Hiram Brighton  
 George Meeker as Harry Grange  
 Charles Coleman as Ponsby  
 Adrian Morris as Al  
 Robert Emmett Keane as Larry Kincaid 
 Frank Orth as Steve  
 Irving Bacon as Fisherman 
 Jimmy Aubrey as Mac  
 Don Brodie as Reporter  
 Paul E. Burns as Furniture Company Mover  
 James Conaty as Gambler  
 Robert Conway as Riverside Terrace Desk Clerk  
 Sayre Dearing as Racetrack Spectator 
 Ralph Dunn as First Bartender  
 Fern Emmett as Jenny  
 Bess Flowers as Racetrack Spectator 
 Dick French as Reporter  
 Harold Goodwin as Reporter  
 Sherry Hall as 2nd Bartender  
 Paul Kruger as Parking Attendant  
 Hamilton MacFadden as Reporter  
 Tony Martelli as Gambler  
 Major McBride as Croupier 
 Frank Mills as Counterman  
 Edmund Mortimer as Gambling Casino Patron  
 Field Norton as Gambler 
 Paddy O'Flynn as Reporter  
 James Pierce as Burly Man Downstairs 
 Dick Rich as Mover  
 Jack Richardson as Gambler 
 Cyril Ring as Reporter  
 Bob Rose as Freddy  
 S.S. Simon as Nightclub Patron 
 Larry Steers as Racetrack Spectator

References

Bibliography
 Backer, Ron. Mystery Movie Series of 1940s Hollywood. McFarland, 2010.

External links
 

1940 films
1940 mystery films
American mystery films
Films directed by Eugene Forde
20th Century Fox films
Films produced by Sol M. Wurtzel
American black-and-white films
1940s English-language films
1940s American films